Major General Hugh Lenox Scott (September 22, 1853 – April 30, 1934) was a United States Army officer. A West Point graduate of 1876, he served as superintendent of West Point from 1906 to 1910 and as chief of staff of the United States Army from 1914 to 1917, which included the first few months of American involvement in World War I.

Early life
Scott was born in Danville, Kentucky,  on September 22, 1853, the son of Reverend William McKendry Scott and Mary Elizabeth (Hodges) Scott.  He grew up in Danville and in Princeton, New Jersey, where he was educated at The Lawrenceville School. He attended Princeton University, before being accepted into the United States Military Academy at West Point.

Military career
Scott graduated from West Point with the Class of 1876 (his Cullum number was 2628), and was commissioned in the cavalry. For some twenty years thereafter he served on the Western frontier, chiefly with the 7th United States Cavalry. He was assigned to the quarters only recently vacated by the widow of George Armstrong Custer. In fact, Scott was sent out to the Little Big Horn battle site to mark gravesites for Custer's men killed in the battle. He also had the opportunity to interview many of the Native Americans who fought on both sides of the battle on June 25, 1876. He saw action in campaigns against the Sioux, Nez Perce, Cheyenne and other tribes of the Great Plains and became an expert in their languages and ways of life. He was promoted to first lieutenant in June 1878.

About 1889, while stationed with the 7th Cavalry at Fort Sill in Oklahoma, Scott made the acquaintance of an Indian scout name I-See-O (Plenty Fires) of the Kiowa tribe.  I-See-O enlisted in the Indian Scouts in 1889 and taught Scott Native American sign language and techniques of frontier warfare.  Scott was placed in command of Troop L of the 7th Cavalry on March 29, 1891, and of a detachment of Indian Scouts on September 18, 1891.

When Scott was given command of Troop L of the regiment in 1891, he had I-See-O serve as his first sergeant. (Infantry regiments designated Company I for their Native American scouts, and cavalry regiments did the same with Troop L.) During the ghost dance phenomenon of the early 1890s, I-See-O helped in persuading the Apache and Kiowa tribes not to go to war.  This action, while serving the interest of white settlers and speculators, undoubtedly also saved the lives of many Native Americans.  Scott's gratitude to I-See-O was such that, when he was chief of staff of the army, he allowed for Sergeant I-See-O to remain on active duty for life.

In 1890–91, he was given the responsibility for suppressing the "Ghost Dance" religious movement that swept the Indian reservations and received official commendation for that work. In 1892, he organized Troop L of the 7th Cavalry, composed of Kiowa, Comanche and Apache Indians, and commanded it until it was mustered out, the last Indian unit in the United States Army, in 1897. In 1894–97, he had charge of Geronimo's band of Chiricahua Apache Indian prisoners at Fort Sill, Oklahoma. He was promoted to captain in January 1895, having served as a first lieutenant for  years.

In November 1897, he was attached to the Bureau of American Ethnology of the Smithsonian Institution, where he began preparing a work on Indian sign languages. In May 1898, after the outbreak of the Spanish–American War, he was appointed major of volunteers and assistant adjutant general of the 2nd and 3rd Divisions, I Corps. He saw no action in that war, but in March 1899 went to Cuba as adjutant general of the Department of Havana, with the rank of lieutenant colonel of volunteers.

In May 1900, he became adjutant general of the Department of Cuba and remained in that post until May 1902. During that time, he served for a time as acting governor and took an active part in the transfer of government into Cuban hands. He was promoted to major in the Regular Army in February 1903 and served as military governor of the Sulu Archipelago, Philippines, in 1903–06 and also commanded troops there, taking part in various skirmishes, reorganized the civil government and institutions.  During this assignment he received two Silver Star citations for gallantry in action.

In August 1906, he was named superintendent of the United States Military Academy, a post he held for four years with the temporary rank of colonel. He was promoted to permanent lieutenant colonel in March 1911 and to colonel in August of the same year. He then commanded the 3rd United States Cavalry Regiment in Texas, engaged in settling various Indian troubles.

In March 1913, Scott was promoted to brigadier general in command of the 2nd Cavalry Brigade, still posted to the Southwest. He won a special commendation for his skillful handling of Navajo disturbances at Beautiful Mountain, Arizona, in November 1913. He was named assistant chief of staff in April 1914 and chief of staff of the United States Army from 1914 to 1917, including the first few months of American involvement in World War I. He was promoted to major general in April 1915. He continued to act in a diplomatic role with Indians and Mexican border officials in the Southwest, settling problems with the Paiutes of Utah in March 1915 and recovering property "confiscated" by Pancho Villa in August.

From February to March 1916, Scott served as ad-interim secretary of war but his energies were directed more toward preparation for possible U.S. entry into World War I.  He was very influential in winning early acceptance among civil officials of the notion of conscription.

From May to August 1917, after the official American entry into World War I, he was sent to Russia as a member of the Root Mission, led by Elihu Root, with the intention of keeping Russia in the war.

He retired at the statutory age of 64 on 22 September 1917.  He was succeeded as chief of staff by Tasker H. Bliss.  Despite being retired, Scott was immediately recalled to active duty.  He served stateside and became commander of the 78th Division at Camp Dix, New Jersey, in December and of Camp Dix again in March 1918.

Scott retired finally in May 1919 and served on the Board of Indian Commissioners from 1919 to 1929 and was chairman of the New Jersey State Highway Commission from 1923 to 1933. In 1928, Scott published an autobiography, Some Memories of a Soldier, a memoir of his 41 years in the United States Army.

Death and legacy
Scott died in Washington, D.C., on April 30, 1934, and was buried among many other family members in Section 2 of Arlington National Cemetery.

There is a large bas relief memorial plaque in his honor in the Washington National Cathedral. His papers are held by the Library of Congress, and Princeton University.

Dates of rank
 United States Military Academy Cadet – class of 1876

Awards
 Distinguished Service Medal
 2 Silver Star citations
 Indian Campaign Medal
 Spanish War Service Medal
 Army of Cuban Occupation Medal
 Philippine Campaign Medal
 Mexican Border Service Medal
 World War I Victory Medal

Namesake
 The US Navy lead transport ship 
 Scott Middle School in Fort Knox, Kentucky

Works
 Some Memories of a Soldier (1928), New York : The Century Company, xvii, 673 p., [52] leaves of plates.
 Selected Kiowa Stories from the Papers of Hugh Lenox Scott (1920; Digitized page images & text)

In popular culture
General Scott appears as a character in The Friends of Pancho Villa (1996), a historical novel by James Carlos Blake.

References

Further reading

External links

 Hugh Lenox Scott Papers at the Seeley G. Mudd Manuscript Library, Princeton University

|-

United States Army Chiefs of Staff
United States Military Academy alumni
Superintendents of the United States Military Academy
Recipients of the Distinguished Service Medal (US Army)
Burials at Arlington National Cemetery
1853 births
1934 deaths
People from Danville, Kentucky
American military personnel of the Spanish–American War
American military personnel of the Philippine–American War
United States Army generals of World War I
Lawrenceville School alumni
Princeton University alumni
United States Army generals
Recipients of the Silver Star
United States Army Cavalry Branch personnel
American military personnel of the Russian Civil War
American military personnel of the Indian Wars